Vigilante is an insecticide used with both dairy and beef cattle to reduce the number of flies in an agricultural area. It is usually formatted as a 50-gram bolus containing 9.7% diflubenzuron, an insect growth regulator which inhibits the formation of chitin and prevents insects from reproducing. The bolus is administered via balling gun. It is effective in reducing populations of horn flies and face flies for approximately 10–16 weeks.

Vigilante was originally produced by American Cyanamid, and was the first larvicide marketed as a bolus. After the breakup of American Cyanamid, Vigilante was manufactured by Uniroyal Chemical and then by Chemtura.

It is best used as part of an integrated pest management program in combination with other fly-control methods such as insecticidal tags, backrubbers, and periodic spraying.

References 

Insecticide brands
Insect control